The Nine Alliances of Lek Yuen or Kau Yeuk was a regional organization of various groups in Sha Tin Valley, Hong Kong.

Alliances
The nine groups were:
 Tai Wai Yeuk：Chik Chuen Wai
 Tin Sam Yeuk：Tin Sam Wai, San Tin
 Keng Hau Yeuk：Sheung Keng Hau, Ha Keng Hau, Hin Tin
 Pai Tau Yeuk：Pai Tau, Sheung Wo Che, Ha Wo Che, Tung Lo Wan
 Kak Tin Yeuk：Kak Tin, Shan Ha Wai
 Fo Tan Yeuk：Fo Tan, Pat Tsz Wo, Lok Lo Ha, Ho Lek Pui, Kau To, Shek Lau Tung, Shan Mei, Wong Chuk Yeung, Cheung Lek Mei, Au Pui Wan, Kwai Tei, Wo Liu Hang, Chek Nai Ping, Ma Niu
 Sha Tin Tau Yeuk：Sha Tin Tau, Tsok Pok Hang
 Sha Tin Wai Yeuk：Sha Tin Wai, To Shek, Fui Yiu Ha, Mau Tat, Yuen Chau Kok, Wong Uk, Tse Uk
 Siu Lek Yuen Yeuk：Siu Lek Yuen, Chap Wai Kon, Shap Yi Wat, Ngau Pei Sha, Tai Lam Liu, Shek Kwu Lung, Wong Nai Tau, Kwun Yam Shan, Fu Yung Pit, Mau Tso Ngam, Lo Shue Tin, Nam Shan, Fa Sam Hang, Mui Tsz Lam

History

The Che Kung Temple near San Tin Wai village in the Tai Wai area was built and initially managed by Tin Sam village. The village lost its managerial rights in the late 19th century as a consequence of a dispute  that was settled in a lawsuit at the yamen. The Kau Yeuk had provided evidence that it made significant contributions to the renovation of the temple. The Kau Yeuk could prove its case by referring to the rhymed couplets that were inscribed on both sides of the main entrance and that bore its name. The temple was subsequently jointly managed by nine villages of Sha Tin, while Tin Sam Village continued to enjoy some privileges in the worship of Che Kung. Since 1936, the temple has been administered by the Chinese Temples Committee.

References

Sha Tin District